Zerbin are a Canadian indie rock band named after their frontman and vocalist, Jason Zerbin. The other permanent member in the band is guitarist Peter Mol. The group formed in Edmonton in 2009, but moved to the west coast of British Columbia in 2012.

The band's releases consist of the albums Of Fools and Gold (2010) and Darling (2015), and the EPs Christmas! (2011) and Touch (2013).

Zerbin received two 2012 Edmonton Music Awards: Music Video of the Year and Single of the Year, for "New Earth". In July 2015 "New Earth" was voted #17 out of the Top 102 Canadian Songs by listeners of Edmonton's modern rock radio station SONiC 102.9.

Zerbin was selected as Band of the Month for July 2014 by the Victoria, British Columbia modern rock radio station The Zone @ 91-3, as well as by Edmonton's SONIC 102.9 in March 2015.

In 2019, Zerbin and Mol released two singles under the name BROTHER.

On 8 February 2019, Jason Zerbin released his first solo single, titled "Stay, Pt.1".

On 19 August 2020, Zerbin released a new single, titled "Real Strong Woman".

Discography
Albums
 Of Fools and Gold (2010)
 Darling (2015)

EPs
 Christmas! (2011)
 Touch (2013)
 ''Missing Years: Sin, Love (B-Sides) (2019)

Singles
 "New Earth" (2011)
 "Take Your Heart" (2013)
 "Intrld" (as BROTHER) (2019)
 "Porto Cristo" (as BROTHER) (2019)
 "Violetear" w/ ICELANDIA (2020)
 "Real Strong Woman" w/ Family of Things (2020)
 "Bonnie Doon" (2020)

References

External links
 
 Zerbin Instagram
 Jason Zerbin official website

Canadian indie pop groups
Canadian indie rock groups
Musical groups established in 2009
Musical groups from Edmonton
Musical groups from Victoria, British Columbia
2009 establishments in Alberta